The list of museums in Indian state of Uttar Pradesh.

List

Gallery

References

 
U
M
M